A train simulator is a computer-based video game that simulates rail transport operations. Train Simulator may also refer to any of the following specific simulators:
BVE Trainsim is a Japanese freeware train simulator.
Microsoft Train Simulator (also known as MSTS) is a train simulator for Microsoft Windows, released in July 2001 and developed by UK based Kuju Entertainment.
Microsoft Train Simulator 2 (also known as MSTS 2) is an unreleased sequel to Microsoft Train Simulator, cancelled in 2009 when Aces Studio closed.
Rail Simulator is a train simulator developed by Kuju Entertainment, the company which developed Microsoft Train Simulator with Microsoft.
Train Simulator Classic is a train simulator and successor to Rail Simulator, produced by Rail Simulator Developments Ltd (Dovetail Games).
Train Simulator series is a Japanese train simulation game series produced by Ongakukan.